Alberto Miguel Gamero Morillo (born 3 February 1964) is a Colombian professional football manager and former football player who is the current manager of Colombian side Millonarios.

Honours

Player
Millonarios
Categoría Primera A (1): 1988

Manager
Millonarios 
Copa Colombia (1): 2022
Deportes Tolima
Copa Colombia (1): 2014
Categoría Primera A (1): 2018 Apertura
Boyacá Chicó
Categoría Primera A (1): 2008 Apertura

References

1964 births
Living people
People from Santa Marta
Colombian footballers
Association football defenders
Categoría Primera A players
Unión Magdalena footballers
Millonarios F.C. players
Independiente Medellín footballers
Colombian football managers
Categoría Primera A managers
Boyacá Chicó managers
Deportes Tolima managers
Atlético Junior managers
Categoría Primera A winning managers
Copa Colombia winning managers
Millonarios F.C. managers
Sportspeople from Magdalena Department
Águilas Doradas Rionegro managers